Since 2008, Iceland has three national parks. Prior to 2008 there were four national parks in Iceland; in that year Jökulsárgljúfur and Skaftafell were merged and incorporated into Vatnajökull National Park.

Vatnajökull National Park and Snæfellsjökull National Park are supervised by the Ministry for the Environment and Natural Resources, Þingvellir National Park is supervised by the Ministry for the Prime Minister.

List of national parks of Iceland

Former national parks

 * Were taken into Vatnajökull National Park in 2008.

See also

References

Iceland
 
National parks
National parks